Grace Muriel Earhart Morrissey (December 29, 1899 – March 2, 1998), the younger sister of aviator Amelia Earhart, was a high school teacher, author, and activist. After her sister disappeared on a flight across the Pacific in 1937, Earhart spent decades biographing Amelia's life and managing her legacy. Earhart also taught at the high schools in Medford and Belmont, MA, and she remained an active member of the Medford community until her death.

Personal life 
Earhart was born in Kansas City on December 29, 1899,  two years after her sister Amelia, to parents Edwin and Amy Earhart. The sisters had a turbulent childhood, filled with trips back and forth between their grandparents’ house in Atchison, KS and their parents’ home in Kansas City. Earhart's father was an alcoholic.

Earhart was close with Amelia, and the two loved playing outdoor games, sledding, and spending time with animals. Both sisters relocated to the Boston area after they grew up, and Earhart spent most of her life in Medford, MA. She married Albert Morrissey, a World War I veteran, in 1929. They had two children.

Earhart attended Smith College and received a degree from Radcliffe College in 1960. 
Additionally, she studied at Saint Margaret's School in Toronto, where in 1917 she was visited by Amelia who decided to stay to help with the war effort, and got a job at the Spadina Military Hospital. While in Toronto, Amelia and Muriel were surrounded by pilots, as the city was "the undeclared capital of flying in the British Empire."  It has been said that Amelia fell in love with flying. "The interest aroused in me in Toronto led me to all the air circuses in the vicinity," Amelia once told reporters.

Historical work and writings on Amelia Earhart 

After Amelia Earhart's 1937 disappearance, Muriel Earhart's life took on a new dimension. Earhart devoted significant time to coordinating Amelia's posthumous affairs, setting up donations, marshalling information, and dealing with Amelia's fans. She corresponded with museums, aviation clubs, the U.S. Air Force, and Eleanor Roosevelt.

Earhart also spoke out against the speculations that arose in the wake of Amelia's death. She denied, for example, that her sister died while on a spy mission, as some theorists have past suggested.

Earhart wrote two books about Amelia, Courage is the Price and Amelia, My Courageous Sister. The last known 1935 Lockheed Electra L-10E — the type of plane Amelia flew in 1937 — is named after Muriel Earhart.

Other work 
In addition to writing about her sister, Muriel Earhart wrote a biography of her husband detailing his experiences during World War I. The biography is titled “The Quest of A Prince of Mystic: Henry Albert Morrissey ‘The Chief.’” Earhart also wrote poetry.

In Medford, Earhart was a charter member of the Medford Zonta Club, a School Committee member, a League of Women Voters member, a member of the Daughters of the American Revolution, and member of the Medford Historical Society. In 1979, Earhart was Medford’s Citizen of the Year.

Earhart taught English in Belmont and Medford, where she won several teaching awards. One of her students, Massachusetts state representative Wayne Burton, wrote in a local newspaper that Earhart changed his life. “We all remember that one extraordinary teacher who stays with us always, reminding us to settle for nothing less than our best. Muriel Morrissey is mine. In her own way like her sister, she deserves acclaim for her positive influence on the hundreds of students fortunate to experience her dedication to their educational success,” Burton wrote.

References

1899 births
1998 deaths
20th-century American biographers
American women biographers
Radcliffe College alumni
20th-century American women